Leonard Stephens (born July 9, 1978) is a former American football tight end. He played high school football at West Windsor Plainsboro High School in Princeton Junction, New Jersey and college football at Howard University.  He was signed by the San Diego Chargers as an undrafted free agent in 2000.

Stephens was also a member of the Detroit Lions, Washington Redskins, Tampa Bay Buccaneers, Seattle Seahawks and Tennessee Titans.

External links
Detroit Lions bio
Perfect Performance Bio

Players of American football from Miami
American football tight ends
Howard Bison football players
San Diego Chargers players
Detroit Lions players
Scottish Claymores players
Washington Redskins players
Frankfurt Galaxy players
Tampa Bay Buccaneers players
Seattle Seahawks players
Tennessee Titans players
1978 births
Living people